Redemptorist Upper School was a parochial Roman Catholic high school in North Baton Rouge, Louisiana, supervised by the Roman Catholic Diocese of Baton Rouge.

History
St. Gerard Majella Church Parish was established in 1944. St. Gerard High School was opened in September 1947, with an enrollment of forty-three freshmen and sophomores. Louisiana accreditation was obtained in December 1950, and the first class graduated in May of that year with 10 graduates. 1957-58 Unit I (first wing) of the permanent school complex opens. In 1958, it was accredited by the Southern Association of Colleges and Schools. St. Gerard Parish operated the high school until it became an interparochial school in 1963. 1959-60 Units II and III of the school open. Redemptorist then became a Regional Diocesan School on July 1, 1995. The school was governed by a Regional Diocesan School Board consisting of priests and elected and appointed laypersons. The faculty consisted of laymen and laywomen, one priest, and one Redemptorist Brother.

St. Gerard Elementary and St. Isidore Elementary merged into each other to become Redemptorist Elementary in the 2010-11 school year. Redemptorist elementary and Redemptorist High merged into the Redemptorist Schools of Baton Rouge in the 2011-12 school year under the supervision of Mr. Brian Menard. It was announced on December 19, 2014 that Redemptorist High School and Junior High School would close their doors for good on June 30, 2015.

The vacant land was donated to Cristo Rey High School who installed temporary buildings on the site.

Former State Representative and Louisiana Board of Regents member Vic Stelly taught and coached at Redemptorist during the early 1960s. Actress Donna Douglas (The Beverly Hillbillies), then known as Doris Smith, attended St. Gerard's High School.

Athletics
Redemptorist won 4 football state championships; 1959, 2002 (Class 3A), 2003 (Class 4A), 2005 (Class 3A).
1951-52 4 State Boxing Champions
1965 Wolves win Louisiana AA State Baseball Championship.
1967-69 Wolves win consecutive State AA Basketball Championships.

Closing
Redemptorist High School graduated its last class in May 2015.  The high school closed due to plunging enrollment and funds.  Redemptorist High is the second high school in the North Baton Rouge area to close since 2014.

Notable alumni
 Donna Douglas actress notable for her role as Elly Mae Clampett in The Beverly Hillbillies TV series
 Justin Rogers (2006), American football cornerback, Richmond Spiders and Buffalo Bills
 Jeremy Hill, American football running back, LSU Tigers and Cincinnati Bengals
 La'el Collins, American football offensive linemen, LSU Tigers and Dallas Cowboys
 Howard Carter (basketball), American professional basketball player, LSU Tigers and Denver Nuggets
 Russell Gage, American football wide receiver, LSU Tigers football,Atlanta Falcons, and Tampa Bay Buccaneers.

References

http://www.rhsbr.org/history.cfm

External links
 School Website

Defunct Catholic secondary schools in Louisiana
Schools in Baton Rouge, Louisiana
Educational institutions established in 1947
Educational institutions disestablished in 2015
Private middle schools in Louisiana
1947 establishments in Louisiana
2015 disestablishments in Louisiana
Demolished buildings and structures in Louisiana
Buildings and structures demolished in 2016